The Junkers Ju 390 was a German long-range derivative of the Junkers Ju 290 aircraft, intended to be used as a heavy transport aircraft, maritime patrol aircraft and long-range bomber. It was one of the aircraft designs submitted for the abortive Amerikabomber project, along with the Messerschmitt Me 264, the Focke-Wulf Ta 400 and the Heinkel He 277.

Design and development
Two prototypes were created by attaching an extra pair of inner-wing segments onto the wings of Ju 290 airframes and adding new sections to lengthen the fuselages.

The first prototype, V1 (bearing Stammkennzeichen code of GH+UK), was modified from the Ju 90 V6 airframe (Werknummer J4918, civil registration D-AOKD from July 1940 to April 1941, then to the Luftwaffe as KH+XC from April 1941 to April 1942, then returned to Junkers and used for Ju 390 V1 construction). It made its maiden flight on 20 October 1943 and performed well, resulting in an order for 26 aircraft, to be named Ju 390 A-1. None of these had been built by the time that the project was cancelled (along with Ju 290 production) in mid-1944. The second prototype, the V2 (RC+DA), was longer than the V1 because it was constructed from a Ju 290 airframe (using the fuselage of Ju 290 A-1 Werknummer J900155). The maritime reconnaissance and long-range bomber versions were to be called the Ju 390 B and Ju 390 C, respectively.

Operational history
The Ju 390 V1 was constructed and largely assembled at Junkers' plant at Dessau in Germany and the first test flight took place on 20 October 1943.  This was done by adding an additional wing section and powerplants and adding a fuselage section immediately aft of the wings to increase the length to 31 m (102 ft).  Its performance was satisfactory enough that the Air Ministry ordered 26 in addition to the two prototypes. On 29 June 1944, the Luftwaffe Quartermaster General noted that the RLM paid Junkers to complete seven Ju 390 aircraft. The contracts for 26 Ju 390s were cancelled on 20 June 1944 and all work ceased in September 1944. On 26 November 1943, the Ju 390 V1 — with many other new aircraft and prototypes — was shown to Adolf Hitler at Insterburg, East Prussia. According to the logbook of former Junkers test pilot Hans-Joachim Pancherz, the Ju 390 V1 was brought to Prague immediately after it had been displayed at Insterburg and took part in a number of test flights, which continued until March 1944, including tests of inflight refueling. The Ju 390 V1 was returned to Dessau in November 1944, where it was stripped of parts and finally destroyed in late April 1945 as the US Army approached.

Different sources present different accounts of the history of the Ju 390 V2. Kössler and Ott (1993) stated that the Ju 390 V2 was completed during June 1944, with flight tests beginning in late September 1944. Green (1970) wrote that the armament was four 20 mm MG 151/20s and three 13 mm (.51 in) MG 131 machine guns. At a hearing before British authorities on 26 September 1945, Professor Heinrich Hertel, chief designer and technical director of Junkers Aircraft & Motor Works, asserted the Ju 390 V2 had never been completed. German author Friedrich Georg claimed in his book that test pilot Oberleutnant Joachim Eisermann recorded in his logbook that he flew the V2 prototype (RC+DA) on 9 February 1945 at Rechlin air base. The log is said to have recorded a handling flight lasting 50 minutes and composed of circuits around Rechlin, while a second 20-minute flight was used to ferry the prototype to Lärz. Kay (2004) stated that the second Ju 390 prototype was discarded without being flown because of a July 1944 RLM decree sanctioning an end to all large combat plane programs in Nazi Germany in favor of the Emergency Fighter Program. Pancherz himself stated in 1980 that the only the first Ju 390 flew and cast doubt on all claims of the Ju 390 making a test flight to New York.

Alleged flights

South Africa flight
A Ju 390 is claimed by some to have made a test flight from Germany to Cape Town in early 1944. The sole source for the story is a speculative article which appeared in the Daily Telegraph in 1969 titled "Lone Bomber Raid on New York Planned by Hitler", in which Hans Pancherz reportedly claimed to have made the flight. Author James P. Duffy has carried out extensive research into this claim, which has proved fruitless. Authors Kössler and Ott make no mention of this claim either, despite having interviewed Pancherz.

New York flight
The first public mention of an alleged flight of a Ju 390 to North America appeared in a letter published in the November 1955 issue of the British magazine RAF Flying Review, of which aviation writer William Green was an editor. The magazine's editors were skeptical of the claim, which asserted that two Ju 390s had made the flight and that it included a one-hour stay over New York City. In March 1956, the Review published a letter from an RAF officer which claimed to clarify the account. According to Green's reporting, in June 1944, Allied Intelligence had learned from prisoner interrogations that a Ju 390 had been delivered in January 1944 to Fernaufklärungsgruppe 5, based at Mont-de-Marsan near Bordeaux and that it had completed a 32-hour reconnaissance flight to within  of the U.S. coast, north of New York City. This was rejected just after the war by British authorities. Aviation historian Dr. Kenneth P. Werrell states that the story of the flight originated in General Report on Aircraft Engines and Aircraft Equipment, two British intelligence reports from August 1944, which were based in part on the interrogation of prisoners. The reports claimed that the Ju 390 had taken photographs of the coast of Long Island but no photos or other evidence for the existence of such photos has ever been found.

The claimed flight was mentioned in many books following the RAF Flying Review account, including Green's respected Warplanes of the Second World War (1968) and Warplanes of the Third Reich (1970) but without ever citing reliable sources. Further authors then cited Green's books as their source for the claimed flight. Green told Kenneth P. Werrell many years later that he no longer placed much credence in the flight. Werrell later examined the data regarding the range of the Ju 390 and concluded that although a great circle round trip from France to St. Johns, Newfoundland was possible, adding another  for a round trip from St. Johns to Long Island made the flight "most unlikely".

Karl Kössler and Günter Ott, in their book Die großen Dessauer: Junkers Ju 89, 90, 290, 390. Die Geschichte einer Flugzeugfamilie (The Big Dessauers... History of an Aircraft Family), also examined the claimed flight and debunked the flight north of New York. Assuming there was only one aircraft in existence, Kössler and Ott note it was nowhere near France at the time when the flight was supposed to have taken place. According to Pancherz' logbook, the Ju 390 V1 was brought to Prague on 26 November 1943. While there, it took part in test flights which continued until late March 1944. Another explanation for this is that prototypes are never flown at maximum gross weight for their maiden flight until testing can determine the aircraft's handling. According to Kössler and Ott, the Ju 390 V2 could not have made the US flight either, since they indicate that it was not completed before September/October 1944.

Japan flight
In his book The Bunker, author James P. O'Donnell mentions a flight to Japan. O'Donnell claimed that Albert Speer, in an early 1970s telephone interview, stated that there had been a secret Ju 390 flight to Japan "late in the war". The flight, by a Luftwaffe test pilot, had supposedly been non-stop via the polar route. O'Donnell is the sole source for the story; Speer never mentioned the story in any of his writings or other interviews. Kössler and Ott make no mention of the claim.

Variants
Ju 390 V1
First prototype.
Ju 390 V2
Second prototype.
Ju 390 A-1
Planned heavy transport version.
Ju 390 B
Planned maritime patrol version.
Ju 390 C
Planned long-range heavy bomber version.

Operators

 Luftwaffe

Some sources claim that a Ju 390 was assigned to Fernaufklärungsgruppe 5. Kössler and Ott state that it was not.

Specifications (Ju 390 A-1)

See also

References

Notes

Bibliography

 Bukowski, Helmut and Fritz Müller. Junkers Ju 90: Ein Dessauer Riese – Erprobung und Einsatz der Junkers Ju 90 bis Ju 290 (in German). Berlin : Brandenburgisches Verl.-Haus, 1995. .
 Duffy, James P. Target America: Hitler's Plan to Attack the United States. Santa Barbara, California: Greenwood Publishing Group, 2004. .
 Georg, Friedrich. Hitlers Siegeswaffen Band 1 Luftwaffe und Marine, Berlin: Jung Verlag & Amun Verlag Schleusingen, 2000. ASIN: B005RIIA6G 
 Georg, Friedrich. Hitler's Miracle Weapons. Solihull, UK: Helion, 2003. .
 Green, William. Warplanes of the Third Reich. London: Macdonald and Jane's Publishers Ltd., 1970. .
 Griehl, Manfred. Luftwaffe over America: The Secret Plans to Bomb the United States in World War II. London: Greenhill Books, 2006. .
 Griehl, Manfred and Joachim Dressel. Heinkel: He 177, 277, 274. London: Stackpole Books, 1998. .
 Horn, Steve. The Second Attack on Pearl Harbor: Operation K And Other Japanese Attempts. Annapolis, Maryland: US Naval Institute Press, 2005. .
 Kössler, Karl and Günther Ott. Die großen Dessauer: Junkers Ju 89, Ju 90, Ju 290, Ju 390 – Die Geschichte einer Flugzeugfamilie (in German). Berlin: Aviatik-Verlag, 1993. .
 Nowarra, Heinz J. Junkers Ju 290, Ju 390 etc.. Atglen, Pennsylvania: Schiffer Publishing, 1997. .
 O'Donnell, James P. The Bunker. New York: da Capo Press, 2001. .
 Speer, Albert. Inside the Third Reich. New York: Simon & Schuster, 1997. .
 Staerck, Christopher,  Paul Sinnott and Anton Gill. Luftwaffe: The Allied Intelligence Files. London: Brassey's, 2002. .
 Sweeting, C.G. Hitler's Personal Pilot: The Life and Times of Hans Baur. London: Brassey's, 2001. .
 Wagner, Ray and Heinz Nowarra. German Combat Planes: A Comprehensive Survey and History of the Development of German Military Aircraft from 1914 to 1945. Garden City, New York: Doubleday, 1971.

External links

 Das Flugzeugarchiv 
 WarBird Photos

Abandoned military aircraft projects of Germany
1940s German bomber aircraft
1940s German military transport aircraft
Ju 390
World War II heavy bombers of Germany
World War II transport aircraft of Germany
Six-engined tractor aircraft
Low-wing aircraft
Aircraft first flown in 1943
Twin-tail aircraft